Old Cairo (Arabic: مصر القديمة , Miṣr al-Qadīma, Egyptian pronunciation: Maṣr El-ʾAdīma) is a historic area in Cairo, Egypt, which includes the site of a Roman-era fortress, the Christian settlement of Coptic Cairo, and the Muslim-era settlements pre-dating the founding of Cairo proper in AD 969. It is considered part of what is referred to as Historic Cairo, and is a UNESCO World Heritage Site. Miṣr al-Qadīma is also a modern administrative district in the Southern Area of Cairo, encompassing the area from the Cairo Aqueduct to the north, to the Ring Road in the south, and from the Khalifa cemetery to the east, to the Nile Corniche on the west, as well as Roda Island, or Manial al-Roda. It had 250,313 residents according to the 2017 census.

History and description

Roman fort and Coptic Cairo
The Babylon Fortress is a Roman fortification around which many of the Egyptian Christians' oldest churches were built. It is unrelated to ancient Babylon or its empire.

The area of Coptic Cairo is also part of Old Cairo. It comprises ruins of Roman fortifications and many old churches. Modern tourists visit locations such as the Coptic Museum, the Babylon Fortres, the Hanging Church and other Coptic churches.

Count Gabriel Habib Sakakini Pasha (1841–1923), who had become a household name in his time, built a palace and a church in the El-Sakakini area in 1897 and established the Roman Catholic Cemetery in Old Cairo.

Early Muslim city: attractions
Old Cairo contains the remnants of those cities which were capitals before Cairo itself, such as Fustat, al-Askar and al-Qatta'i. These are the location of the Mosque of Amr, the first mosque in the entire of Africa and the Ibn Tulun Mosque, though little else remains today. The Ben Ezra Synagogue, also known as the El-Geniza Synagogue, stands in Fustat.

Fustat, Rashidun and Umayyad capital
After the Muslim conquest of Egypt in 641, Rashidun commander Amr ibn al-As established Fustat just north of Coptic Cairo. At Caliph Umar's request, the Egyptian capital was moved from Alexandria to the new city on the eastern side of the Nile.

Al-Askar, Abbasid capital
The reach of the Umayyads was extensive, stretching from western Spain all the way to western China. However, they were overthrown by the Abbasids, who moved the capital of the Umayyad empire itself to Baghdad. In Egypt, this shift in power involved moving control from the Umayyad city of Fustat slightly north to the Abbasid city of al-‘Askar.
Intended primarily as a city large enough to house an army, it was laid out in a grid pattern that could be easily subdivided into separate sections for various groups, such as merchants and officers.

The peak of the Abbasid dynasty occurred during the reign of Harun al Rashid (r. 786-809), along with increased taxes on the Egyptians, who rose up in a peasant revolt in 832 during the time of Caliph al-Ma'mun (r. 813-833).

Al-Qatta'i, Tulunid capital
Local Egyptian governors gained increasing autonomy, and in 870, governor Ahmad ibn Tulun declared Egypt's independence (though still nominally under the rule of the Abbasid Caliph). As a symbol of this independence, in 868 ibn Tulun founded yet another capital, al-Qatta'i, slightly further north of al-‘Askar. The capital remained there until 905, when the city was destroyed.

Fustat, Abbasid and Fatimid capital
After the destruction of al-Qatta'i, the administrative capital of Egypt returned to al-Fusṭāṭ. However, al-Fusṭāṭ itself was then destroyed by a vizier-ordered fire that burned from 1168 to 1169, as a defensive measure against the attacking Crusader Kingdom of Jerusalem.

Al-Qāhirah, Fatimid and later capital
At this time the capital moved to nearby al-Qāhirah (Cairo), founded in 969, where it has remained to this day. Cairo's boundaries grew to eventually encompass the three earlier capitals of al-Fusṭāṭ, al-Qatta'i and al-‘Askar, the remnants of which can today be seen in Old Cairo in the southern part of the city.

Bulaq port and Azbakeya district (15th century)

During the latter half of the 15th century, two final major transformations took place in Cairo: the port of Bulaq, and a district called Azbakeya in the northwest section of the city. The perimeters of the city had been unchanged for the past 300 years according to the map done by the French expedition in 1798 AD. With Barsbay's conquest of Cyprus in 1428, Bulaq became the major port of Cairo. By the end of the 15th century, Bulaq was even able to take over the role as the major commercial port from Old Cairo.

Conservation and restoration
The effort to conserve Egypt's monuments has existed since the 19th century. In 1881, Khedive Tawfiq founded the Comité de Conservation des Monuments de l'Art Arabe.

World Heritage Site
In 1979, UNESCO designated Old Cairo, as part of wider Historic Cairo, as a World Heritage Site, calling it "one of the world's oldest Islamic cities, with its famous mosques, madrasas, hammams and fountains" and "the new centre of the Islamic world, reaching its golden age in the 14th century."

Modern district and population 
Masr al-Qadima is a Cairo district in the Southern Area made up of one qism (police ward).

The district had 250,313 residents in  2017 spread over 12 shiakhas as follows:

References

World Heritage Sites in Egypt
 
History of Cairo
Districts of Cairo
Historic districts